Norman Bel Geddes (born Norman Melancton Geddes; April 27, 1893 – May 8, 1958) was an American theatrical and industrial designer.

Early life
Bel Geddes was born Norman Melancton Geddes in Adrian, Michigan and was raised in New Philadelphia, Ohio, the son of Flora Luelle (née Yingling) and Clifton Terry Geddes, a stockbroker. When he married Helen Belle Schneider in 1916, they combined their names to Bel Geddes. Their daughters were actress Barbara Bel Geddes and writer Joan Ulanov.

Career

Bel Geddes began his career with set designs for Aline Barnsdall's Los Angeles Little Theater in the 1916–17 season, then in 1918 as the scene designer for the Metropolitan Opera in New York. He designed and directed various theatrical works, from Arabesque and The Five O'Clock Girl on Broadway to an ice show, It Happened on Ice, produced by Sonja Henie. He also created set designs for the film Feet of Clay (1924), directed by Cecil B. DeMille, designed costumes for Max Reinhardt, and created the sets for the Broadway production of Sidney Kingsley's Dead End (1935). 

Bel Geddes opened an industrial-design studio in 1927, and designed a wide range of commercial products, from cocktail shakers to commemorative medallions to radio cabinets. His designs extended to unrealized futuristic concepts: a teardrop-shaped automobile, and an Art Deco House of Tomorrow. In 1929, he designed "Airliner Number 4," a 9-deck amphibian airliner that incorporated areas for deck-games, an orchestra, a gymnasium, a solarium, and two airplane hangars.

His book Horizons (1932) had a significant impact: "By popularizing streamlining when only a few engineers were considering its functional use, he made possible the design style of the thirties." He wrote forward-looking articles for popular American periodicals.

In the classic science fiction film of H. G. Wells' Things to Come (1936), he assisted production designer William Cameron Menzies on the look of the world of tomorrow.

Bel Geddes designed the General Motors Pavilion, known as Futurama, for the 1939 New York World's Fair. For that famous and enormously influential installation, Bel Geddes exploited his earlier work in the same vein: he had designed a "Metropolis City of 1960" in 1936.

Bel Geddes's book Magic Motorways (1940) promoted advances in highway design and transportation, foreshadowing the Interstate Highway System, along with aspects of driver assist and autonomous driving.

The case for the Mark I computer was designed by Bel Geddes at IBM's expense, and put in place just in time for the machine's dedication at Harvard University.

Death and legacy 
Bel Geddes died in New York on May 8, 1958. His autobiography, Miracle in the Evening, was published posthumously in 1960.

Bel Geddes is a member of the American Theater Hall of Fame, a distinction he shares with his daughter, actress Barbara Bel Geddes. The United States Postal Service issued a postage stamp honoring Bel Geddes as a "Pioneer Of American Industrial Design".

The archive of Norman Bel Geddes is held by the Harry Ransom Center at the University of Texas at Austin. This large collection includes models, drafts, watercolor designs, research notes, project proposals, and correspondence. The Ransom Center also holds the papers of Bel Geddes' second wife, the noted costume designer and producer Edith Lutyens Bel Geddes.

Gallery

Selected publications
 Horizons Little Brown, Boston, 1932.
 "Streamlining", Atlantic Monthly, No. 154 (November 1934), pp. 553–558.
 Magic Motorways. Random House, New York, 1940.
 Miracle in the Evening: An Autobiography. Doubleday, New York, 1960. Edited by William Kelley.

See also
Texaco Doodlebug

References and notes

External links

 Norman Bel Geddes Archive at the Harry Ransom Center, University of Texas at Austin
 To New Horizons, film about Geddes' display at the 1939/40 World's Fair

 
1893 births
1958 deaths
20th-century American artists
American industrial designers
People from Adrian, Michigan
People from New Philadelphia, Ohio
Artists from Michigan
Artists from Ohio
Algonquin Round Table